Senator Howell may refer to:

Members of the United States Senate
James B. Howell (1816–1880), U.S. Senator from Iowa from 1870 to 1871
Jeremiah B. Howell (1771–1822), U.S. Senator from Rhode Island from 1811 to 1817

United States state senate members
Clark Howell (1863–1936), Georgia State Senate
Elias Howell (1792–1844), Ohio State Senate
Henry Howell (1920–1997), Virginia State Senate
James F. Howell (born 1934), Oklahoma State Senate
Janet Howell (born 1944), Virginia State Senate
Joseph Howell (1857–1918), Utah State Senate
Robert B. Howell (1864–1933), Nebraska State Senate
Scott Howell (politician) (born 1953), Utah State Senate
William Thompson Howell (1810–1870), Michigan State Senate

See also
Anthony Howells (1832–1915), Ohio State Senate